List of Washington area codes may refer to:

 List of Washington (state) area codes
 List of Washington, D.C., area codes